Errol Eichstadt (born 5 October 1938) is a South African former cricketer. He played in one first-class match for Eastern Province in 1968/69.

See also
 List of Eastern Province representative cricketers

References

External links
 

1938 births
Living people
South African cricketers
Eastern Province cricketers
People from Worcester, South Africa
Cricketers from the Western Cape